Nadeem Javed (born 12 September 1984) is a Pakistani cricketer. He played in 17 first-class and 21 List A matches between 2001 and 2009. He made his Twenty20 debut on 28 April 2005, for Sialkot Stallions in the 2004–05 National Twenty20 Cup.

References

External links
 

1984 births
Living people
Pakistani cricketers
Pakistan Customs cricketers
Sheikhupura cricketers
Sialkot cricketers
Sialkot Stallions cricketers
People from Sheikhupura District